The Swansea Blitz was the heavy and sustained bombing of Swansea by the German Luftwaffe from 19 to 21 February 1941. A total of 230 people were killed and 397 were injured. Swansea was selected by the Germans as a legitimate strategic target due to its importance as a port and docks and the oil refinery just beyond, and its destruction was key to Nazi German war efforts as part of their strategic bombing campaign aimed at crippling coal export and demoralizing civilians and emergency services.

PRA planning

With the passing of the Air Raid Precaution Act of 1937, Swansea Council was responsible for instigating civil defence measures to protect the local population of 167,000 people. The local authority looked into building communal air raid shelters and setting up the necessary rescue and fire services.

With the threat of war with Germany growing towards the end of the 1930s, Swansea council had built over 500 communal air raid shelters as well as providing Anderson shelters for domestic premises. With the outbreak of war in September 1939, the pace of providing shelters increased further. To complement the already-built communal shelters, the council requisitioned cellars and basements as makeshift shelters.

Those with gardens often built Anderson shelters to take refuge in. However, not everyone was so fortunate, and others had to use crowded public shelters. In late 1940, Morrison shelters were introduced, which were not much more than a steel table to hide under inside the house. Others made a nightly trek to nearby rural areas, sleeping in tents, cars, or even on the beach.

Bombing raids

First raid, June 1940
The first air raid on Swansea commenced at 3.30 am on 27 June 1940. An initial marker flare was dropped by a Luftwaffe plane, and the following bombers dropped high explosives to the east of the city centre in the Danygraig residential area. The raid was relatively light, with no casualties reported to the ARP controllers. A number of unexploded bombs were discovered in the Kilvey Hill area.

The Three Nights' Blitz

Through the rest of 1940, Swansea was targeted by single and small groups of enemy bombers. There were several small-scale raids in January 1941, but the worst bombing period occurred over three nights on 19, 20, and 21 February 1941. This period, to become known as the Three Nights' Blitz, started at 7.30 pm on 19 February.

On the first night, the building housing both the Regimental HQ of 79th (Hertfordshire Yeomanry) Heavy Anti-Aircraft Regiment, Royal Artillery and the Gun Operations Room (GOR) at Swansea was destroyed by a bomb. Two officers and five other ranks were killed or died of wounds, but the guns continued firing under local control, and communications were maintained.

On the evening of 21 February, there was confusion between the Sector Operations Room at RAF Pembrey and the temporary Swansea GOR. This resulted in the guns ceasing fire between 20.20 and 21.10, and as no Night fighters arrived, the town centre was left unprotected. Although some raiders were shot down once the restriction was lifted, the centre of Swansea was devastated, and fires and delayed-action bombs destroyed communications.

By the time the "all clear" siren sounded after three days, major parts of Brynhyfryd, Townhill, and Manselton had been destroyed, and 230 people were dead and 409 injured. Moreover, 7,000 people had lost their homes. The city centre suffered direct hits that started major conflagrations destroying many commercial premises, including the Ben Evans department store and the Victorian market.

Over the three nights of the blitz, a total of nearly 14 hours of enemy activity were recorded. 1,273 high explosive bombs and 56,000 Incendiary bombs were estimated to have been dropped. An area measuring approximately 41 acres was targeted, with 857 properties destroyed and 11,000 damaged. To raise morale following the blitz, the King and Queen as well as the prime minister, Winston Churchill, visited Swansea.

Further bombing
Swansea was the target for several more raids, with the last being recorded on 16 February 1943.

School bombed

The 19th-century grammar school that had stood on Mount Pleasant Hill since 1851 and was the alma mater of Dylan Thomas, Roy Jenkins, and Bryan Phillips took a direct hit and was severely damaged. The science laboratories, gymnasium, and workshops survived, however, and teaching was soon resumed for older boys by using rooms in what had been the headmaster's house. Younger boys were relocated to a nearby vacant 'deaf-and-dumb' school building, which had evacuated its pupils to the country. This hurriedly improvised arrangement endured until 1949. The headmaster, J. Gray Morgan, was largely responsible for this effort to avoid disrupted schooling.

Notes

References
 Basil Collier, History of the Second World War, United Kingdom Military Series: The Defence of the United Kingdom, London: HM Stationery Office, 1957.
 Brig N.W. Routledge, History of the Royal Regiment of Artillery: Anti-Aircraft Artillery 1914–55, London: Royal Artillery Institution/Brassey's, 1994, .
 Col J.D. Sainsbury, The Hertfordshire Yeomanry Regiments, Royal Artillery, Part 2: The Heavy Anti-Aircraft Regiment 1938–1945 and the Searchlight Battery 1937–1945, Welwyn: Hertfordshire Yeomanry and Artillery Trust/Hart Books, 2003, .

External links
BBC
Swansea Blitz feature on Youtube
Warden remembers Swansea Blitz (BBC Wales)
Scars of the blitz remain (BBC Wales)
Pictures of the Swansea Blitz

The Blitz j
History of Swansea
1941 in military history
1941 in Wales
20th century in Swansea
1940s in Glamorgan